The 2019 Tajikistan Cup is the 28th edition of the Tajikistan Cup, the knockout football tournament of Tajikistan. The cup winner qualifies for the 2020 AFC Cup.

Qualifying round
The draw of the qualifying and preliminary rounds was held on 7 May 2019. The matches were played between 8 and 25 May 2019.

Dushanbe and Rasht zones

First qualifying round
8 May: “Rasht” (Rasht) - “Mehrgon” (Nurabad) - 4: 1

Second qualifying round
11 May (first leg): “Orzu” (Shahrinav) - “Rasht” (Rasht) - 6: 0

15 May (second leg): “Rasht” (Rasht) - “Orzu” (Shahrinav) - 2: 0

Third qualifying round
19 May (first leg): “Orzu” (Shakhrinav) - “Zarafshon” (Penjikent) - 0: 1

25 May (second leg): “Zarafshon” (Penjikent) - “Orzu” (Shahrinav) - 3: 1

Khatlon zone

First qualifying round
8 May (first leg): Kushoniyon (Kushoniyon) - Mohir (Yavan) - 0: 1

11 May (second leg): “Mohir” (Yavan) - “Kushoniyon” (Kushoniyon) - 6: 3

Preliminary round
The first legs were played on 26–28 May 2019, and the second legs were played on 8–9 and 18 June 2019.

26 May (first leg): “Ravshan” (Kulyab) - “Dusti” (Jaihun) - 1: 3

26 May (first leg): “Isfara” (Isfara) - “Ravshan” (Zafarabad) - 2: 0

27 May (first leg): “Barkchi” (Hissar) - “Shohmansur” (Dushanbe) - 4: 1

27 May (first leg): Vahdat (Vahdat) - Lokomotiv-Pamir (Dushanbe) - 0: 0

27 May (first leg): “Khulbuk” (Vose) - “Faizkand” (Vose) - 3: 2

27 May (first leg): “Saroykamar” (Pyanj) - “Mohir” (Yavan) - 5: 2

27 May (first leg): “Eskhata” (Khujand) - “Parvoz” (Khujand International Airport) - 0: 1

28 May (first leg): Dushanbe-83 (Dushanbe) - Zarafshon (Penjikent) - 3: 0 (awd.)

8 June (second leg): “Shohmansur” (Dushanbe) - “Barkchi” (Gissar) - 0: 6

8 June (second leg): “Faizkand” (Vose) - “Khulbuk” (Vose) - 0: 0

8 June (second leg): “Parvoz” (Khujand International Airport) - “Eskhata” (Khujand) - 1: 2

9 June (second leg): “Dusti” (Jaihun) - “Ravshan” (Kulyab) - 2: 1

9 June (second leg): “Mohir” (Yavan) - “Saroykamar” (Pyanj) - 1: 3

9 June (second leg): Ravshan (Zafarabad) - Isfara (Isfara) - 0: 0

18 June (second leg): “Lokomotiv-Pamir” (Dushanbe) - “Vahdat” (Vahdat) - 0: 1

Not played (second leg): Zarafshon (Penjikent) - Dushanbe-83 (Dushanbe) - 0: 3 (awd.)

Round of 16
The draw for the round of 16 onwards was held on 12 July 2019. Teams from the Tajikistan Higher League entered at this stage. The first legs were played on 30–31 July and 2 August 2019, and the second legs were played on 3–6 August 2019.

30 July (first leg): “Saroykamar” (Pyanj) - “Khatlon” (Bokhtar) - 0: 1

30 July (first leg): “Khujand” (Khujand) - “Vahdat” (Vahdat) - 7: 0

30 July (first leg): "Dushanbe-83" (Dushanbe) - CSKA "Pamir" (Dushanbe) - 1: 1

31 July (first leg): Regar-TadAZ (Tursunzade) - Kuktosh (Rudaki) - 0: 0

31 July (first leg): “Eskhata” (Khujand) - “Isfara” (Isfara) - 4: 2

31 July (first leg): “Istaravshan” (Istaravshan) - “Khulbuk” (Vose) - 1: 0

31 July (first leg): “Dusti” (Jaihun) - “Panjsher” (Jaloliddin Balkhi) - 1: 1

2 August (first leg): Istiklol (Dushanbe) - Barkchi (Gissar) - 7: 2

3 August (second leg): “Khatlon” (Bokhtar) - “Saroykamar” (Pyanj) - 5: 1 (agg 6: 1)

3 August (second leg): CSKA Pamir (Dushanbe) - Dushanbe-83 (Dushanbe) - 0: 0 (agg 1: 1, CSKA Pamir won on away goals)

3 August (second leg): “Isfara” (Isfara) - “Eskhata” (Khujand) - 3: 3 (agg 5: 7)

4 August (second leg): “Kuktosh” (Rudaki) - “Regar-TadAZ” (Tursunzade) - 2: 2 (agg 2: 2, Regar-TadAZ won on away goals)

4 August (second leg): “Khulbuk” (Vose) - “Istaravshan” (Istaravshan) - 3: 1 (agg 3: 2)

4 August (second leg): Panjshir (Jaloliddin Balkhi) - Dusti (Jaihun) - 0: 1 (agg 1: 2)

5 August (second leg): Barkchi (Gissar) - Istiklol (Dushanbe) - 1: 7 (agg 3: 14)

6 August (second leg): “Vahdat” (Vahdat) - “Khujand” (Khujand) - 0: 5 (agg 0: 12)

Quarter-finals
The first legs were played on 21 August 2019, and the second legs were played on 27 August 2019.

21 August (first leg): “Khatlon” - “Khujand” - 0: 2

21 August (first leg): “Eskhata” - “Istiklol” - 1: 2

21 August (first leg): CSKA Pamir - Regar-TadAZ - 1: 1

21 August (first leg): “Hulbuk” - “Dusti” - 2: 1

27 August (second leg): “Khujand” - “Khatlon” - 1: 0 (agg 3: 0)

27 August (second leg): "Regar-TadAZ" - CSKA "Pamir" - 2: 1 (agg 3: 2)

27 August (second leg): “Dusti” - “Hulbuk” - 2: 2 (agg 3: 4)

27 August (second leg): “Istiklol” - “Eskhata” - 6: 0 (agg 8: 1)

Semi-finals
The first legs were played on 1 October 2019, and the second legs were played on 1 November 2019.

First leg

Second leg

Final
The final was played on 24 November 2019.

See also
2019 Tajikistan Higher League

External links

Tajikistan Cup News

References

Tajikistan Cup
Tajikistan
Cup